Epioblasma penita, the southern combshell or  penitent mussel, is a species of freshwater mussel, an aquatic bivalve mollusk in the family Unionidae, the river mussels.

This species is endemic to the United States.  Its natural habitat is rivers. It is threatened by habitat loss.

References

Molluscs of the United States
penita
Bivalves described in 1834
Taxa named by Timothy Abbott Conrad
ESA endangered species
Taxonomy articles created by Polbot